Sidi Lakhdar is a district in Mostaganem Province, Algeria. It was named after its capital, Sidi Lakhdar.

Municipalities
The district is further divided into 3 municipalities:
Sidi Lakhdar
Hadjadj
Benabdelmalek Ramdane

Districts of Mostaganem Province